Welcome centers, also commonly known as visitors' centers, visitor information centers, or tourist information centers, are buildings located at either entrances to states on major ports of entry, such as interstates or major highways, e.g. U.S. Routes or state highways, or in strategic cities within regions of a state, e.g. Southern California, Southwest Colorado, East Tennessee, or the South County region of Rhode Island. These welcome centers, which first opened on May 4, 1935 next to U.S. Route 12 in New Buffalo, Michigan, are locations that serve as a rest area for motorists, a source of information for tourists or new residents that enter a state or a region of a state, and a showcase for the state. These features make welcome centers, visitors centers, and service plazas, which are similar to welcome centers, distinct from rest areas. In Alaska and Hawaii, their unique geographical locations preclude them from having welcome centers as known in the rest of the U.S.

Nomenclature
Welcome centers can be thought as covering several different concepts: state-owned and operated welcome centers near a state's border, state or municipal-owned and operated visitors centers in cities or rural areas, and service plazas on toll roads, e.g. the New Jersey Turnpike or MassPike, that are either state-owned and -operated, state-owned but operated by a private company, or privately owned and operated. (Visitors' centers in cities can either be owned and operated by the state, a county, a municipality, a local Chamber of Commerce, or be a joint effort between a county and/or a city and a Chamber of Commerce to support and publicize a well-known tourist district, city, or region.) States have different ways of naming welcome centers, but some of the most common ones are welcome centers, visitors centers, or visitors information centers.

Locations
The welcome centers are normally located the first few exits into a state, e.g. Exit 2 on I-84 in Connecticut entering from New York State. However, some welcome centers, visitors' centers, or service plazas are located some distance away from a state's border, serving certain cities, e.g. Johnson City, Tennessee or Oceanside, California's local Chamber of Commerce, major cities, such as New Orleans, Louisiana, or well-known tourist districts, such as the Pigeon Forge, Tennessee tourist district.

Facilities
The welcome centers and service plazas usually consist of a large building or buildings with public restroom facilities, free brochures relating to nearby attractions, lodging, and dining, a free official state highway map updated at regular intervals, staffed desks for people to ask for assistance, picnic areas, nearby restaurants or onsite dining facilities, gas stations, and large parking lots. In addition to the aforementioned, there is normally a large flagpole with the state flag in front of the welcome center.

In large cities like New Orleans or San Francisco, smaller cities like Astoria, Oregon or Vicksburg, Mississippi, as well as rural areas, visitor centers may be in a building of varied size with most of the above amenities included, i.e. restroom facilities, staffed desks for people to ask for assistance, nearby restaurants, free brochures relating to nearby attractions, lodging, and dining. In addition, an urban or rural visitors center may have things of local, regional, or even national interest, such as rare and/or antiquated artifacts or small knickknacks (e.g. coins, stamps, or sports memorabilia).

Differences in administration of welcome centers
Each state varies in its administration of welcome centers. For example, in Georgia, the Georgia Department of Transportation (GDOT) constructs and maintains its 9 welcome centers, while in Tennessee, the Tennessee Department of Tourist Development constructs and maintains Tennessee's 14 welcome centers.

Gallery

List of official state welcome centers, visitors' centers and service plazas in the United States
Below is a list of welcome centers, visitors' centers and service plazas, as distinct from rest areas, in the United States, derived from a combination of state tourism websites and the Interstate Rest Areas website. The list includes the state agency responsible for the welcome centers and service plazas; the interstate, U.S. Route, state highway, or local street address that the welcome center or service plaza is located at; the city, the county or other political subdivision that the welcome center or service plaza's city is located in; and explanatory footnotes.

Footnotes

References

External links

Interstate Rest Areas

Restrooms in the United States
Visitor centers in the United States
Tourism in the United States